Espen Næss Lund (born 7 May 1985) is a retired Norwegian football player.

In 2020 he started his manager career as head coach of Re FK.

Career statistics

References

1985 births
Living people
People from Re, Norway
Sportspeople from Tønsberg
Norwegian footballers
Vålerenga Fotball players
FK Tønsberg players
Sogndal Fotball players
Strømmen IF players
Kristiansund BK players
Norwegian First Division players
Eliteserien players
Norway youth international footballers
Association football defenders